The 1986 Australian Sports Car Championship was a CAMS sanctioned Australian motor racing title for drivers of Group A Sports Cars. It was the 18th Australian Sports Car Championship.

The championship was won by former open wheel star and twice Australian Drivers' Champion John Bowe driving the 5.8 litre Chevrolet powered Veskanda C1 built by K&A Engineering in Adelaide. Bowe dominated the five round series winning all seven races, scoring fastest lap in each race (including outright lap records at Surfers Paradise and Calder) and pole position at each round. Terry Hook finished in 2nd place in his Lola T610 Chevrolet with reigning champion Chris Clearihan 3rd in his JWS-Kaditcha Chevrolet.

1984 Australian Sports Car Champion Bap Romano crashed his Cosworth DFL powered Romano WE84 heavily in the opening round at Sydney's tight Amaroo Park circuit. The WE84's throttle stuck wide open on the run up Bitupave Hill just past the pits and Romano was unable to slow the car, eventually destroying the front of the car in the tyre barriers. Romano himself broke both legs in the crash but was fully conscious when pulled out of the car. The crash ended the Romano WE84's racing life which had begun in 1983 as a Kaditcha K583.

Calendar
The championship was contested over a five-round series.

Classes
Cars competed in three classes according to engine capacity: In 1986 CAMS relaxed the previous 5000cc engine limit for the Over 3 litre cars and allowed engines of up to 6000cc.
 Up to 1.6 litres
 1.6 to 3 litres
 Over 3 litres

Points system
Championship points were awarded to the top twenty outright race positions, based on the following three tier structure:

For rounds contested over multiple heats, the aggregate points achieved by each driver were divided by the number of heats to arrive at the driver's championship points allocations for the round.

Results
Top 10 results only.

References

External links
 Australian Motor Racing Year, 1986/87		
 CAMS Manual of Motor Sport, 1986			
 Race Year, 1986			
 www.camsmanual.com.au

Australian Sports Car Championship
Sports